Bip Apollo (also known online as "Bip Graffiti", "BiP", and "Believe in People") is a formerly anonymous painter and sculptor who is, according to at least one description, "known internationally for his role in spear-heading the North American street art revival". He initially came to public attention in 2010 around New Haven, Connecticut, moved to the San Francisco Bay Area around 2013 or 2014, and began extensively traveling internationally in 2015.

Practice
Bip produces work internationally as a large-scale muralist, street artist, and an occasional animator. BiP does not consider his spray-painting, stenciling, and wheat-pasting to be traditional graffiti, as graffiti artists focus on perfecting lettering styles, spreading their brand and other common characteristics of graffiti. According to Bip, "traditional graffiti writers would be infuriated to hear his work called 'graffiti.  Likewise, Bip has claimed publicly that his work is not committed to graffiti for graffiti’s sake but rather, dedicated to a spirit of resistance to skepticism and estrangement, so as to positively change the way people interact with their environment.

In 2011, Bip allowed Kimberly Chow, a 2009 Yale University alumnus and former Yale Daily News reporter, to interview him and witness him in action painting a piece that visualizes the origins to his creative work. According to Chow, the name, "BiP", as an abbreviation of "believe in people", is a manifesto in response to a theme the artist discovered repeated throughout his deceased childhood friend's journals.

East Coast period
Bip's spray-paint and stencil murals began popping up during nighttime hours around New Haven beginning in October 2010. Early in his career, Bip illegally painted buildings and spaces around Yale University in New Haven. One of his highest-profile paintings in New Haven is a large smiling portrait of Anne Frank located outside of Partner's Cafe, a bar on Crown Street, a nightlife district.

During this time, reactions to Bip's work were polarizing. While his illegal work was celebrated by some city residents and journalists, some city officials condemned his works as acts of vandalism. Abigail Rider, real estate manager for Yale University said:

City spokeswoman of New Haven Elizabeth Benton, on the "Encurbagement" project of BiP, said:

Despite such negative reactions, Bip persisted. After he was invited to produce a mural at a lumberyard, NBC Connecticut speculated about his identity and intentions.

West Coast period 
In what is confirmed from news articles to be 2013 or 2014, Bip relocated to a permanent residence in San Francisco, California. After re-location, Bip discontinued painting illegally and began to paint gigantic murals with permission. In 2015, Bip completed a 7-story mural in the Tenderloin district of San Francisco, depicting a man examining his own heart under a microscope.

The following year, Bip created a 5-story mural in downtown Oakland, California, of an elderly Oakland resident listening to a heavy metal album.

Bip followed this growth with a string of large buildings throughout the Bay Area and by 2018 had become synonymous with the West Coast street art revival.

Bip's most well known mural is a 2017 5-story building for the San Francisco Westfield Centre, known as "No Ceiling", depicting a young African-American resident with artificially large muscles. In 2018 Bip announced plans to continue with up to ten additional buildings in San Francisco.

International/touring period 
Starting in 2015, Bip began to travel aggressively, painting for international museums and public art festivals while maintaining total anonymity. Beginning with an eight-story mural for the Museum of Krasnoyarsk, Russia, Bip followed with a tour of South America sponsored by Montana Colors Spraypaint as well as a four-story mural for the Museum of Contemporary Art in Taipei, Taiwan.

Throughout this time, Bip continued to wear a mask that has become a part of his public persona.

In a 2017 interview with reporter Jonathan Curiel of San Francisco Weekly, Bip reflected on the changes brought on by international success as a young artist.

References

External links
 

American graffiti artists
People from Connecticut
American investment bankers
Princeton University alumni
American expatriates in Taiwan
American expatriates in Russia
American expatriates in Hong Kong
Living people
Year of birth missing (living people)